The Tower of Isula di Gargali is a ruined Genoese tower located in the commune of Osani on the eponymous islet off the west coast of the Corsica. The rocky islet lies within the Scandola Nature Reserve.

The tower was one of a series of coastal defences constructed by the Republic of Genoa between 1530 and 1620 to stem the attacks by Barbary pirates.

See also
List of Genoese towers in Corsica

References

Towers in Corsica